Anil Kumar Sen was a Bengali Indian jurist, who had served as chief justice of the Calcutta High Court.

He was educated at the Scottish Church College, and at the University of Calcutta.

He served as a chief justice of the Calcutta High Court in 1986.

References

20th-century Indian judges
Chief Justices of the Calcutta High Court
Scottish Church College alumni
University of Calcutta alumni
Bengali people
Year of birth missing
Possibly living people